18th Lux Style Awards

Date: 
8 July 2019
 
Host:

Director:

Venue: 
Expo Center, Karachi, Sindh

Best Film:
Cake

Best TV Play:
Suno Chanda

←17th Lux Style Awards  19th→

The 18th Lux Style Awards presented by Lux to honor the best in fashion, music, films and Pakistani television of 2018, took place on 7 July 2019 at Expo Center, Karachi, Sindh.
 17th Lux Style Awards

Film
Nominees for 18th Lux Style Awards were announced on 4 March 2019.

Television

Criticism
Criticism came from audience that Yumna Zaidi was snubbed for not being nominated despite giving a powerful performance in Dar Si Jaati Hai Sila.Many have argued that Suno Chanda (Best Television Play winner) did not age well compared to the other nominated dramas like Dar Si Jaati Hai Sila and Dil Mom Ka Diya, both of which were the most acclaimed dramas of that year. There is also a discourse over Iqra Aziz's double win for Suno Chanda, accordingly to critics Neelam Muneer could have easily won either of the awards as she gave a much more dynamic performance in Dil Mom Ka Diya.

Music

Special

Chairperson's Lifetime Achievement Award
Shabnam

References

Lux Style Awards ceremonies
2018 film awards
2018 television awards
2018 music awards
Lux
Lux
July 2019 events in Pakistan
Lux